The 2012 World Senior Curling Championships were held at the Tårnby Curling Club in Tårnby, Denmark from April 14 to 21. Tårnby has previously hosted the 2006 World Senior Curling Championships, the 2011 European Mixed Curling Championship, and the 2011 European Curling Championships' Group C competitions, and hosted the 2012 European Junior Curling Challenge. For the first time since 2009, the event was not held in conjunction with the same year's World Mixed Doubles Championship.

Men

Round-robin standings
Final round-robin standings

Playoffs

Bronze-medal game
Saturday, April 21, 14:00

Gold-medal game
Saturday, April 21, 14:00

Women

Round-robin standings
Final round-robin standings

Playoffs

Bronze-medal game
Saturday, April 21, 14:00

Gold-medal game
Saturday, April 21, 14:00

References
General

Specific

External links

Results from CupOnline
Tårnby Curling Club Website

World Senior Curling Championships, 2012
World Senior Curling Championships
Tårnby Municipality
International curling competitions hosted by Denmark
2012 in Danish sport